Elin Johanna Bergman (born 6 August 1995) is a Swedish singer. She was the first runner-up of the Swedish Idol 2013, losing to Kevin Walker.

During week 9 of the show, the contestants each composed and wrote a song alongside several established songwriters. The songs were then presented live at Idol, and Bergman's song "The Fire" managed to chart on Sverigetopplistan at number 19. Some of her songs, along with other contestants' songs, were released by Universal Music.

Personal life
Bergman was born in Umeå.

Discography

Singles

References

1995 births
People from Umeå
Living people
Idol (Swedish TV series) participants
21st-century Swedish singers
21st-century Swedish women singers